South Carolina Highway 213 (SC 213) is a  state highway in the U.S. state of South Carolina. The highway travels through mostly rural areas of Newberry and Fairfield counties. It also connects Jenkinsville and the Winnsboro area.

Route description
SC 213 begins at an intersection with U.S. Route 176 (US 176) southeast of Pomaria within Newberry County, where the roadway continues as Parr Road. It travels to the east and crosses over Crims Creek. A short distance later, the highway crosses over the Broad River, Hampton Island and some railroad tracks on an unnamed bridge. This bridge marks the Fairfield County line. SC 213 travels to the northeast and intersects SC 215 (Monticello Road) near Jenkinsville. The two highways travel concurrently along the southeastern edge of the Monticello Reservoir. They split, with SC 213 traveling to the east. A short distance later, it curves to the northeast and then crosses over Little River. Farther to the northeast is a crossing of Robinson Branch. It skirts along the southwestern edge of the city limits of Winnsboro. After a short rural section, it meets its eastern terminus, an intersection with US 321/SC 34 just southwest of Winnsboro Mills. This intersection also marks the southern terminus of US 321 Business (Columbia Road).

Major intersections

See also

References

External links

SC 213 at Virginia Highways' South Carolina Highways Annex

213
Transportation in Newberry County, South Carolina
Transportation in Fairfield County, South Carolina